Putianxi (Putian West) railway station is a goods station in Guancheng Hui District, Zhengzhou, Henan. Located on the Longhai Railway, the station is one of the largest freight train stations in China.

History
The station was established in 1953 as Zhengzhoudong railway station when the freight yard of Zhengzhou railway station was separated from it.

In 2011, since the high-speed railway station in Zhengzhou on the Beijing–Guangzhou–Shenzhen–Hong Kong high-speed railway was named as Zhengzhoudong, this station was renamed to its current name to avoid ambiguity.

References

Railway stations in Henan
Railway stations in Zhengzhou
Stations on the Longhai Railway
Railway stations in China opened in 1953